Erik Olsson (born 22 September 1995) is a Swedish footballer who plays as a midfielder.

References

External links

1995 births
Living people
Association football midfielders
Gefle IF players
Swedish footballers
Allsvenskan players